Bašajkovac is a karst hill which rises northeast of town Livno in  Bosnia and Herzegovina. At the bottom of the hill there is spring of Bistrica River called Duman.

History 
The fortification wall of Upper Town has a few preserved towers including popular Weiss or Vujadin Tower.

See also
List of mountains in Bosnia and Herzegovina

References

Mountains of the Federation of Bosnia and Herzegovina